Washingtonian is a monthly magazine distributed in the Washington, D.C. area. It was founded in 1965 by Laughlin Phillips and Robert J. Myers. The magazine describes itself as "The Magazine Washington Lives By". The magazine's core focuses are local feature journalism, guide book–style articles, real estate, and politics.

Editorial content

Washingtonian publishes information about local professionals, businesses, and notable places in Washington, D.C. 

Each issue includes information on popular local attractions, such as restaurants, neighborhoods, and entertainment, such as fine art and museum exhibits. There is a regular in-depth feature reporting on local institutions, politicians, businessmen, academics, and philanthropists.The magazine also has information about essential services and real estate listings within Washington. 

Since 1971, the magazine has annually nominated up to 15 people as "Washingtonians of the Year". The magazine describes the award as honoring men and women "who give their time and talents to make this a better place".  

Washingtonian has won five National Magazine Awards.

Leadership
In August 2009, Washingtonian announced that Garrett Graff would replace long-time editor John A. Limpert as editor-in-chief. Limpert is currently editor-at-large. Graff left in 2014 and was replaced by Michael Schaffer.

Washingtonian is a family-owned publication. The former CEO was Philip Merrill (1934–2006), who was succeeded as chairman by his wife, Eleanor; their daughter Catherine Merrill Williams is the president and publisher.

See also
List of newspapers in Washington, D.C.

References

External links
 

1965 establishments in Washington, D.C.
Local interest magazines published in the United States
Monthly magazines published in the United States
Magazines established in 1965
Magazines published in Washington, D.C.